The Tai Lü people (Tai Lue: ᦺᦑᦟᦹᧉ, Dǎi lè, Lư̄) are an ethnic group of China, Laos, Thailand, Burma and Vietnam. They speak a Southwestern Tai language.

Etymology
The word Lü (ລື້) is similar to the Lao people in the Tai Lü language. Tai Lü can be written as Tai Lue, Dai Le and Dai Lue. They are also known as Xishuangbanna Dai, Sipsongpanna Tailurian and Tai Sipsongpanna. The word Lue (Thai: เหนือ Tai Lue: ᦟᦹᧉ) in the Tai languages means "north", thus their ethnonym means Northern Tai which they share with Tai Nua people.

Distribution
In Vietnam, most Lu live in Lai Châu Province and their population was 5,601 in 2009. In China, they are officially recognized as part of the Dai ethnic group. The 2000 census counted about 280,000 Dai people speaking Lü language. The population in Thailand, where they are called Thai Lue, was in 2001 estimated to be approximately 83,000. Most Thai Lue in Thailand live in Nan, Chiang Rai, Phayao and Chiang Mai Province. They sing khap lue and play pi mae - free reed wind bamboo instrument.

In Vietnam, Lu are the indigenous people in Mường Thanh ("Land of the God of Tai people", Tai Lü: muong theng). They had built Tam Vạn wall in Mường Thanh and managed there for 19 generations before Hoàng Công Chất, a Thái leader, came. Nowadays, nearly all Vietnamese Lu live in Lai Châu Province. The Lu take their father's last name and have the middle name Bạ (for males) and Ý (for females). Their religion is Theravada Buddhism.

Tai Lü Kingdom

Gallery

References

External links

Ethnologue entry for Lu

Tai peoples
Ethnic groups in Thailand
Ethnic groups in Vietnam
Ethnic groups in China